Matěj Vydra (born 1 May 1992) is a Czech professional footballer who plays as a striker for Viktoria Plzeň and the Czech Republic national team.

Vydra previously played for FC Chotěboř, Vysočina Jihlava, Baník Ostrava, Club Brugge, Udinese, Watford, Derby County and Burnley. He spent two loan spells at Watford.

Club career
Vydra joined Baník Ostrava from Vysočina Jihlava in January 2010 at the age of 17 for 20 million CZK (€765,000). He spent six months at Baník Ostrava, where he scored four goals in 14 matches.

Udinese
In June 2010, Vydra moved to Serie A side Udinese and was also voted by sports journalists the Czech Revelation of the Year for his performances at Baník Ostrava in the 2009–10 season. He joined Club Brugge on loan in August 2011 but returned to Udinese having played just two games due to an injury.

Watford (loan)
In July 2012, it was confirmed he had been loaned to Watford for the 2012–13 season. Vydra scored his first goal for Watford when he netted the winner against Crystal Palace on 18 August 2012, in a game which finished 3–2.

He scored a goal against Leeds United on 10 November. Vydra then scored goals in successive matches in a 2–0 win against Nottingham Forest on 22 December 2012 and in a 3–1 away win over Brighton & Hove Albion on 29 December 2012. He scored another brace on 12 January 2013 against Middlesbrough. Vydra carried on his rich vein of form by netting another goal the week after, on 19 January 2013 against Huddersfield and then netted his third goal in as many games a week later, scoring twice on 26 January 2013 in a 3–0 win away to Nottingham Forest. He was in fine form, and netted another goal in his next start against Bolton on 2 February 2013. The match eventually finished 2–1 to Watford, with Vydra assisting Almen Abdi's winning goal. After three matches without a goal, Vydra netted his 20th goal of the campaign in a 2–1 win over Derby County on 23 February 2013.

On 25 March 2013 it was announced that he had won the 2012–13 Championship Player of the Season award in his first season in English football. Vydra won the award ahead of Glenn Murray of Crystal Palace and Blackpool's Thomas Ince. Despite going on a run in which he didn't score in 13 games, he went on to score twice in the semi-final of the end-of-season play-offs in a 3–2 aggregate win over Leicester. Vydra's season at Watford finished in disappointment as his club lost the chance to be promoted to the English top-flight after losing the play-off final against Crystal Palace and he injured his ankle during the match, having to be substituted at half time.

West Bromwich Albion (loan)
Vydra joined Premier League club West Bromwich Albion on a season-long loan deal on 13 August 2013. He scored his first goal for the club on 21 December 2013, equalising for West Brom in a 1–1 Premier League draw against Hull City. On 22 February 2014, Vydra scored his second goal for West Brom, equalising in a 1–1 draw against Fulham. His third goal for the club came in a 3–3 draw against Tottenham, with Vydra scoring the game's first goal after 28 seconds.

Return to Watford

On 26 June 2014, Watford announced they had re-signed Vydra on a season-long loan from Udinese, with a view to a permanent move. Vydra made a scoring return as he netted in Watford's 3–0 opening day win over Bolton Wanderers on 9 August 2014. On 25 April, he came on as a substitute to score as Watford beat Brighton & Hove Albion 2–0 at the Falmer Stadium thus securing Watford's promotion back to the Premier League, thanks to other results going their way, with Vydra scoring 16 goals in the Championship to help earn promotion.

Watford
Watford signed Vydra permanently in July 2015 with the player signing a five-year contract. He started the 2015–16 season behind Odion Ighalo and Troy Deeney in the pecking order, on 25 August 2015, he played for Watford in a 1-0 loss against Preston in the League Cup.

Reading (loan)
On 1 September 2015, Reading signed Vydra on a season-long loan for a fee of £2.5 million with an option to sign him permanently for £10 million if promoted to the Premier League in the 2016–17 season. He made his Reading debut on 11 September 2015 in a 5-1 win against Ipswich Town. He scored his first goal for the club on 31 October in a 1-1 draw against Brighton.

On 19 January 2016 in a FA Cup Third Round Replay, he scored a hat-trick in a 5–2 comeback victory over Huddersfield Town. In total he scored 9 goals in 36 appearances in all competitions for the club, finishing the club's 2nd top scorer (behind Nick Blackman) for the 2015–16 season.

Derby County
On 27 August 2016, Derby County announced that they had signed Watford striker Vydra on a four-year deal, for a fee reported at £8,000,000. He scored his first goal for the club in a 2–1 loss to Blackburn Rovers on 24 September 2016. In his first Derby season he scored 5 goals, making 33 appearances in the EFL Championship with 13 of those coming as a substitute, with Vydra playing in different positions with the likes of Tom Ince, Darren Bent, Johnny Russell and David Nugent all competing for attacking position roles.

Vydra scored his first hat-trick for the club in a 3–0 away win over Middlesbrough on 25 November 2017. After the sale of previous season top scorer Tom Ince and the acquisitions of Strikers Sam Winnall and Cameron Jerome, Vydra found himself playing in his favoured second striker position behind a central striker of either Winnall, Jerome, David Nugent or Chris Martin His goals during the 2017–18 season helped Derby reach the playoff semi finals, where they were knocked out over two legs by Fulham.

In April 2018, he was named in the PFA Championship Team of the Year and also in the EFL Championship Team Of The Year. He scored 22 goals in all competitions and received the Sky Bet Championship Golden Boot after scoring 21 goals in the Championship during the 2017–18 season. On 1 May, Vydra won 3 awards at the club's end of season awards ceremony winning the Player Of The Year, Players Player Of The Year and the Jack Stamps Player Of The year awards.

In July 2018, Vydra held talks with fellow EFL Championship side Leeds United over a potential move. However, after weeks of negotiations, the move broke down over personal terms.

Burnley
Burnley signed Vydra for an undisclosed fee on a three-year deal from Derby on 7 August 2018. On 30 August 2018, he scored on his debut in a 1–1 draw against Olympiakos in the play-off round of the Europa League. on 22 September, he scored his first goal in the Premier League in a 4–0 victory over AFC Bournemouth.

On 15 February 2020, Vydra netted his first league goal since September 2018 in a 2–1 win against Southampton, that goal was later voted as Premier League Goal of the Month for February. 

After Burnley’s relegation, Vydra left at the end of his contract and returned to his hometown to sign for Victor Plezn on a free transfer.

International career
Vydra played for five Czech youth national teams between under-16 and under-21 levels. In August 2012 he was called up to the Czech senior team for the first time, for a World Cup qualifying match away to Denmark and a friendly match against Finland. Vydra played the first 73 minutes against Denmark, in a game that finished as a goalless draw. He scored his first goal, a header, for the national team on 26 March 2013 in a World Cup qualifier against Armenia, to open the scoring in a 3–0 victory. Vydra also scored the second goal of the game, robbing an Armenian defender of the ball before slotting past the keeper.

Career statistics

Club

International

As of match played 8 September 2021. Czech Republic score listed first, score column indicates score after each Vydra goal.

Honours
Watford
Football League Championship runner-up: 2014–15

Individual
PFA Team of the Year: 2012–13 Championship, 2017–18 Championship
Football League Championship Player of the Year: 2013
Football League Championship: Golden Boot 2017–18
Football League Championship Team Of The Year 2017–18
Derby County Player Of The Year 2017–18
Derby County Players Player Of The Year 2017–18
Premier League Goal of the Month: February 2020

References

External links

 
 
 
 
 Burnley F.C. profile

1992 births
Living people
People from Chotěboř
Czech footballers
Czech Republic international footballers
Czech Republic under-21 international footballers
Czech Republic youth international footballers
Association football forwards
FC Vysočina Jihlava players
FC Baník Ostrava players
Udinese Calcio players
Club Brugge KV players
Watford F.C. players
West Bromwich Albion F.C. players
Reading F.C. players
Derby County F.C. players
Burnley F.C. players
Czech First League players
Czech National Football League players
Serie A players
Belgian Pro League players
Premier League players
English Football League players
UEFA Euro 2020 players
Czech expatriate footballers
Czech expatriate sportspeople in Italy
Expatriate footballers in Italy
Czech expatriate sportspeople in Belgium
Expatriate footballers in Belgium
Czech expatriate sportspeople in England
Expatriate footballers in England
Sportspeople from the Vysočina Region
FC Viktoria Plzeň players